My Name Is Legion is a phrase from the Gospels of Matthew (8:28–34), Mark, and Luke. It may refer to:

 My Name Is Legion (novel), by A. N. Wilson
 My Name Is Legion (Zelazny collection), an anthology
 O Meu Nome É Legião (My Name Is Legion in Portuguese), a novel by António Lobo Antunes

See also